Susan Kent may refer to:

Susan Bertie, Countess of Kent (1554–?)
Susan Kent (actress) (born 1975), Canadian actor and comedian
Susan Kent (politician), member of the Minnesota Senate